Andrew 'Andy' Lukas (born 19 July 1950) is a former Australian rules footballer who played for Carlton and Fitzroy in the VFL during the early 1970s. He was born Andrew Lukimitis but in 1971 changed his surname to Lukas by deed poll.

The son of Latvian parents, Lukas was recruited from Fawkner and made his way into the seniors at Carlton in 1970 after playing for their Under-19s. He was used mostly as a defender and came off the bench in the 1972 Grand Final win over Richmond. In 1973 Lukas crossed to Fitzroy where he spent three seasons before retiring from the league and finishing his career at Dandenong.

References

Blueseum Biography: Andrew Lukas
Holmesby, Russell and Main, Jim (2007). The Encyclopedia of AFL Footballers. 7th ed. Melbourne: Bas Publishing.

1950 births
Living people
Australian rules footballers from Victoria (Australia)
Carlton Football Club players
Carlton Football Club Premiership players
Fitzroy Football Club players
One-time VFL/AFL Premiership players